Konrad Winkler can refer to:

 Konrad Winkler (skier) (born 1955), former East German skier
 Konrad Winkler (fencer) (1882–1962), Polish fencer